Gustave Roth (1909–1982) was a Belgian boxer.

1909 births
1982 deaths
Belgian male boxers